Intelligence assessment, or simply intel, is the development of behavior forecasts or recommended courses of action to the leadership of an organisation, based on wide ranges of available overt and covert information (intelligence). Assessments develop in response to leadership declaration requirements to inform decision-making. Assessment may be executed on behalf of a state, military or commercial organisation with ranges of information sources available to each.

An intelligence assessment reviews available information and previous assessments for relevance and currency. Where there requires additional information, the analyst may direct some collection.

Intelligence studies is the academic field concerning intelligence assessment, especially relating to international relations and military science.

Process 

Intelligence assessment is based on a customer requirement or need, which may be a standing requirement or tailored to a specific circumstance or a Request for Information (RFI). The "requirement" is passed to the assessing agency and worked through the intelligence cycle, a structured method for responding to the RFI.

The RFI may indicate in what format the requester prefers to consume the product.

The RFI is reviewed by a Requirements Manager, who will then direct appropriate tasks to respond to the request. This will involve a review of existing material, the tasking of new analytical product or the collection of new information to inform an analysis.

New information may be collected through one or more of the various collection disciplines; human source, electronic and communications intercept, imagery or open sources. The nature of the RFI and the urgency placed on it may indicate that some collection types are unsuitable due to the time taken to collect or validate the information gathered. Intelligence gathering disciplines and the sources and methods used are often highly classified and compartmentalised, with analysts requiring an appropriate high level of security clearance.

The process of taking known information about situations and entities of importance to the RFI, characterizing what is known and attempting to forecast future events is termed "all source" assessment, analysis or processing. The analyst uses multiple sources to mutually corroborate, or exclude, the information collected, reaching a conclusion along with a measure of confidence around that conclusion.

Where sufficient current information already exists, the analysis may be tasked directly without reference to further collection.

The analysis is then communicated back to the requester in the format directed, although subject to the constraints on both the RFI and the methods used in the analysis, the format may be made available for other uses as well and disseminated accordingly. The analysis will be written to a defined classification level with alternative versions potentially available at a number of classification levels for further dissemination.

Target-centric intelligence cycle

This approach, known as Find-Fix-Finish-Exploit-Assess (F3EA), is complementary to the intelligence cycle and focused on the intervention itself, where the subject of the assessment is clearly identifiable and provisions exist to make some form of intervention against that subject, the target-centric assessment approach may be used.

The subject for action, or target, is identified and efforts are initially made to find the target for further development. This activity will identify where intervention against the target will have the most beneficial effects.

When the decision is made to intervene, action is taken to fix the target, confirming that the intervention will have a high probability of success and restricting the ability of the target to take independent action.

During the finish stage, the intervention is executed, potentially an arrest or detention or the placement of other collection methods.

Following the intervention, exploitation of the target is carried out, which may lead to further refinement of the process for related targets. The output from the exploit stage will also be passed into other intelligence assessment activities.

Intelligence Information Cycle Theory 
The Intelligence Information Cycle leverages secrecy theory and U.S. regulation of classified intelligence to re-conceptualize the traditional intelligence cycle under the following four assumptions:

 Intelligence is secret information
 Intelligence is a public good
 Intelligence moves cyclically
 Intelligence is hoarded

Information is transformed from privately held to secretly held to public based on who has control over it. For example, the private information of a source becomes secret information (intelligence) when control over its dissemination is shared with an intelligence officer, and then becomes public information when the intelligence officer further disseminates it to the public by any number of means, including formal reporting, threat warning, and others. The fourth assumption, intelligence is hoarded, causes conflict points where information transitions from one type to another. The first conflict point, collection, occurs when private transitions to secret information (intelligence). The second conflict point, dissemination, occurs when secret transitions to public information. Thus, conceiving of intelligence using these assumptions demonstrates the cause of collection techniques (to ease the private-secret transition) and dissemination conflicts, and can inform ethical standards of conduct among all agents in the intelligence process.

See also 
 All-source intelligence
 Intelligence cycle
 List of intelligence gathering disciplines
 Military intelligence
 Surveillance
 Threat assessment
 Futures studies

References

Further reading 
 Surveys
 Andrew, Christopher. For the President's Eyes Only: Secret Intelligence and the American Presidency from Washington to Bush (1996)
 Black, Ian and Morris, Benny Israel's Secret Wars: A History of Israel's Intelligence Services (1991)
 Bungert, Heike et al. eds. Secret Intelligence in the Twentieth Century (2003) essays by scholars
 Dulles, Allen W. The Craft of Intelligence: America's Legendary Spy Master on the Fundamentals of Intelligence Gathering for a Free World (2006)
 Kahn, David The Codebreakers: The Comprehensive History of Secret Communication from Ancient Times to the Internet (1996), 1200 pages
 Lerner, K. Lee and Brenda Wilmoth Lerner, eds. Encyclopedia of Espionage, Intelligence and Security (2003), 1100 pages. 850 articles, strongest on technology
 Odom, Gen. William E. Fixing Intelligence: For a More Secure America, Second Edition (Yale Nota Bene) (2004)
 O'Toole,  George. Honorable Treachery: A History of U.S. Intelligence, Espionage, Covert Action from the American Revolution to the CIA (1991)
 Owen, David. Hidden Secrets: A Complete History of Espionage and the Technology Used to Support It (2002), popular
 Richelson, Jeffery T. A Century of Spies: Intelligence in the Twentieth Century (1997)
 Richelson, Jeffery T. The U.S. Intelligence Community (4th ed. 1999)
 Shulsky, Abram N. and Schmitt, Gary J. "Silent Warfare: Understanding the World of Intelligence" (3rd ed. 2002), 285 pages
 West, Nigel. MI6: British Secret Intelligence Service Operations 1909–1945 (1983)
 West, Nigel. Secret War: The Story of SOE, Britain's Wartime Sabotage Organization (1992)
 Wohlstetter, Roberta. Pearl Harbor: Warning and Decision (1962)

 World War I
 Beesly, Patrick.  Room 40. (1982). Covers the breaking of German codes by RN intelligence, including the Turkish bribe, Zimmermann telegram, and failure at Jutland.
 May, Ernest (ed.) Knowing One's Enemies: Intelligence Assessment before the Two World Wars (1984)
 Tuchman, Barbara W. The Zimmermann Telegram (1966)
 Yardley, Herbert O. American Black Chamber (2004)

 World War II 1931–1945
 Babington Smith, Constance. Air Spy: the Story of Photo Intelligence in World War II (1957) - originally published as Evidence in Camera in the UK
 Beesly, Patrick. Very Special Intelligence: the Story of the Admiralty's Operational Intelligence Centre, 1939–1945 (1977)
 Hinsley, F. H. British Intelligence in the Second World War (1996) (abridged version of multivolume official history)
 Jones, R. V. Most Secret War: British Scientific Intelligence 1939–1945 (2009)
 Kahn, David.  Hitler's Spies: German Military Intelligence in World War II (1978)
 Kahn, David.  Seizing the Enigma: the Race to Break the German U-Boat Codes, 1939–1943 (1991)
 Kitson, Simon.  The Hunt for Nazi Spies: Fighting Espionage in Vichy France, Chicago:  University of Chicago Press, (2008). 
 Lewin, Ronald. The American Magic: Codes, Ciphers and the Defeat of Japan (1982)	
 May, Ernest (ed.) Knowing One's Enemies: Intelligence Assessment before the Two World Wars (1984)
 Smith, Richard Harris. OSS: the Secret History of America's First Central Intelligence Agency (2005)
 Stanley, Roy M. World War II Photo Intelligence (1981)
 Wark, Wesley K. The Ultimate Enemy: British Intelligence and Nazi Germany, 1933–1939 (1985)
 Wark,  Wesley K. "Cryptographic Innocence: the Origins of Signals Intelligence in Canada in the Second World War", in: Journal of Contemporary History 22 (1987)

 Cold War Era 1945–1991
 Aldrich, Richard J. The Hidden Hand: Britain, America and Cold War Secret Intelligence (2002).	
 Ambrose, Stephen E. Ike's Spies: Eisenhower and the Intelligence Establishment (1981).
 Andrew, Christopher  and Vasili Mitrokhin. The Sword and the Shield: The Mitrokhin Archive and the Secret History of the KGB (1999)
 Andrew, Christopher, and Oleg Gordievsky. KGB: The Inside Story of Its Foreign Operations from Lenin to Gorbachev (1990).
 Bogle, Lori, ed. Cold War Espionage and Spying (2001), essays by scholars
 Boiling, Graham. Secret Students on Parade: Cold War Memories of JSSL, CRAIL, PlaneTree, 2005. 
 Dorril, Stephen. MI6: Inside the Covert World of Her Majesty's Secret Intelligence Service (2000).
 Dziak,  John J. Chekisty: A History of the KGB (1988)
 Elliott, Geoffrey and Shukman, Harold. Secret Classrooms. An Untold Story of the Cold War. London, St Ermin's Press, Revised Edition, 2003. 
 Koehler, John O. Stasi: The Untold Story of the East German Secret Police (1999)
 Ostrovsky, Viktor By Way of Deception (1990)
 Persico, Joseph. Casey: The Lives and Secrets of William J. Casey-From the OSS to the CIA (1991)
 Prados, John. Presidents' Secret Wars: CIA and Pentagon Covert Operations Since World War II (1996)  	 	
 Rositzke, Harry. The CIA's Secret Operations: Espionage, Counterespionage, and Covert Action (1988)
 Trahair, Richard C. S. Encyclopedia of Cold War Espionage, Spies and Secret Operations (2004), by an Australian scholar; contains excellent historiographical introduction
 Weinstein, Allen, and Alexander Vassiliev. The Haunted Wood: Soviet Espionage in America—The Stalin Era (1999).

External links 
 Intelligence Literature: Suggested Reading List (CIA)
 The Literature of Intelligence: A Bibliography of Materials, with Essays, Reviews, and Comments by J. Ransom Clark, Emeritus Professor of Political Science, Muskingum College

 
Data collection
Intelligence analysis